Tim Walton (born March 11, 1971) is an American football coach for the Ohio State Buckeyes of the NCAA who most recently was a defensive coach for the Jacksonville Jaguars and is the former defensive coordinator for the St. Louis Rams of the National Football League (NFL).  He played college football at Ohio State.

Walton was the secondary coach under head coach Nick Saban when the Louisiana State Tigers won the BCS National Champsionhip in 2003.

NFL coaching career

Detroit Lions
Walton served four years as secondary coach for the Detroit Lions under head coach Jim Schwartz.

St. Louis Rams
Walton was hired by the St. Louis Rams as defensive coordinator on February 12, 2013.  On January 29, 2014, the Rams announced they would not be renewing Walton's contract with the team. The Rams quickly hired Gregg Williams, a former Jeff Fisher assistant in Tennessee, to take Walton's place.

New York Giants
On January 15, 2015, the New York Giants announced they hired Walton as their secondary/cornerbacks coach.

Jacksonville Jaguars
On January 16, 2019, the Jacksonville Jaguars hired Walton as their cornerbacks coach. Head Coach Doug Marrone stated that the recommendation from Jim Schwartz was a big reason for Walton's hiring. ″He said if I’m going to be a head coach again, the one guy I would hire as a secondary coach would be Tim,″ Marrone said. ″When I brought him, everything that was told to me was exactly what I thought. Someone who is extremely strong, does a good job with players and gets a lot of out of them.″ In 2021 he was retained by Urban Meyer and remained on the Jaguars staff. He missed the team’s week 5 game against the Tennessee Titans due to Covid-19 symptoms.

Return to college coaching

Ohio State Buckeyes
On January 14, 2022, Walton was officially announced as the secondary/cornerbacks coach for his alma mater, the Ohio State Buckeyes.

References

8. ^ Hope, Dan (January 13, 2021). "https://www.elevenwarriors.com/ohio-state-football/2022/01/128684/ohio-state-hires-former-jacksonville-jaguars-cornerbacks-coach-tim-walton

External links
 New York Giants profile
 Detroit Lions bio
 Memphis Tigers bio

1971 births
Living people
American football cornerbacks
Ohio State Buckeyes football players
Bowling Green Falcons football coaches
Memphis Tigers football coaches
Syracuse Orange football coaches
LSU Tigers football coaches
Miami Hurricanes football coaches
Detroit Lions coaches
St. Louis Rams coaches
National Football League defensive coordinators
New York Giants coaches
Jacksonville Jaguars coaches